Christian Ruuttu (born 20 February 1964) is a Finnish former professional ice hockey player, who currently serves as a scout.

Ruuttu is the father of Alexander Ruuttu, who was drafted by the Phoenix Coyotes. His father Kalevi Ruuttu is a former Bandy World Championship referee.

Playing career
Christian Ruuttu grew up in Pori, where he attended the Swedish-speaking Björneborgs svenska samskola comprehensive school while playing for the Ässät Finnish Elite League club. He was originally drafted by the Buffalo Sabres of the National Hockey League in the 1983 NHL Entry Draft, 7th round, 134th overall. He played six seasons in Buffalo from 1986–87 through 1991–92, attaining career highs in goals (26 in 1987–88), assists (46 in 1988–89), and points (71 in 1987–88). In Ruuttu's last season in Buffalo, his totals dropped to 4 goals and 21 assists.

Ruuttu began the 1992–93 season playing for the Chicago Blackhawks after being traded for goaltender Stephane Beauregard. He played there for the next two and one-half seasons before being traded to the Vancouver Canucks midway through the 1994–95 season.

After his career as a player, Ruuttu served as General Manager of the Espoo Blues of the Finnish Pro League and was a board member of the Finnish Elite League. He joined the Phoenix Coyotes organization as the Director of European Scouting. He is currently the Director of European Scouting for the Los Angeles Kings.

Career statistics

Regular season and playoffs

International

References

Awards
Finnish First All-Star Team (1986)
Played in NHL All-Star Game (1988)

External links

1964 births
Living people
Arizona Coyotes scouts
Buffalo Sabres draft picks
Buffalo Sabres players
Chicago Blackhawks players
Espoo Blues players
Finnish ice hockey centres
Frölunda HC players
Los Angeles Kings scouts
People from Lappeenranta
Swedish-speaking Finns
Vancouver Canucks players
Sportspeople from South Karelia